Avanashi (SC) is a legislative assembly, that includes the city, Avanashi. Its State Assembly Constituency number is 112. From 1977, this seat is reserved for scheduled caste. Avanashi assembly constituency is a part of Tiruppur Lok Sabha constituency. This is one of the two assembly constituencies having inter-district boundaries of limit, the other being Udumalpet. It is one of the 234 State Legislative Assembly Constituencies in Tamil Nadu, in India.

Madras State

Tamil Nadu

Election results

2021

2016

2011

2006

2001

1996

1991

1989

1984

1980

1977

1971

1967

1962

1957

References 

 

Assembly constituencies of Tamil Nadu
Nilgiris district